Huangqu is a station on Line 6 of the Beijing Subway. This station opened on December 30, 2012.

Station layout 
The station has an underground island platform.

Exits 
There are 4 exits, lettered A, B, C, and D. Exit D is accessible.

References

Railway stations in China opened in 2012
Beijing Subway stations in Chaoyang District